Pleasant Street was a station located just outside the Pleasant Street incline (the southern end of the Tremont Street subway) in downtown Boston, Massachusetts.  Opening along with the rest of the Main Line Elevated (Main Line El) in June 1901, it served Main Line El trains from 1901 to 1908, temporarily replacing streetcar service through the Pleasant Street Incline (the streetcar lines formerly running into the Tremont Street subway through the incline were rerouted to the El's southern terminal at ).  In 1908, with the completion of the Washington Street Tunnel, the elevated trains were rerouted through the new tunnel, and Pleasant Street station was closed; although streetcar service to North Station through the Pleasant Street Incline promptly resumed (continuing until 1962), the streetcars did not stop at Pleasant Street.

Station layout

References

1898 establishments in Massachusetts
1963 disestablishments in Massachusetts
Railway stations located underground in Boston
Railway stations closed in 1908
Railway stations in the United States opened in 1901